The 1990 Peru State Bobcats football team was an American football team that represented Peru State College and won the national championship during the 1990 NAIA Division II football season. In their fifth season under head coach Tom Shea, the Bobcats compiled a 12–0–1 record. The team was led by quarterback Nate Bradley who passed for a school-record 3,806 yards.

Schedule

References

Peru State Bobcats
Peru State Bobcats football seasons
NAIA Football National Champions
College football undefeated seasons
Peru State Bobcats football